Alexandre Cebrian Valente is a film producer and director from Portugal. His film Second Life was the second highest-grossing Portuguese film in 2009.

References

External links 

Living people
Year of birth missing (living people)
Place of birth missing (living people)
Portuguese film directors
Portuguese film producers